Collon is a village in Ireland. Collon may also refer to:

Albert Collon, Belgian ice hockey player
Dominique Collon, Belgian-born academic
Michel Collon, Belgian writer
Nicholas Collon (born 1983), British conductor
Mont Collon, mountain in the Swiss Alps